Josh Wolff (born February 25, 1977) is an American soccer coach and former player. He is currently the head coach of Austin FC in Major League Soccer.

Playing career

College
Born in Stone Mountain, Georgia, Wolff played three years of college soccer at the University of South Carolina, where he scored 21 goals and eight assists in 43 games. He played at South Carolina with future United States national team star Clint Mathis. In addition, Wolff played and captained varsity soccer at Parkview High School, Lilburn, Georgia.

Professional
After his junior season, Wolff left college and signed with Major League Soccer. MLS assigned Wolff to the Chicago Fire. He set the MLS rookie scoring record (together with Jeff Cunningham, since broken by Damani Ralph) by scoring eight goals, doing so in just 14 games with only four starts. Wolff played the following four seasons for the Fire, scoring 24 goals, but suffered through multiple injuries.

Before the 2003 MLS Superdraft, the Fire traded Wolff, in a cost-cutting move, to the Kansas City Wizards in exchange for the third overall pick, which the Fire used to select Nate Jaqua.  Wolff missed most of the 2003 season due to injuries.  He rebounded in 2004 by scoring ten goals and seven assists during the season. Wolff scored his first career playoff goal on a penalty kick during the MLS Cup 2004. He scored ten goals and ten assists in 2005.

In September 2006, Wolff had a try out with English Championship club Derby County. The team was pleased enough with his performance to offer MLS a $500,000 transfer fee. However, British immigration officials denied Wolff a work permit based on the fact he had failed to play the required 75% of the U.S. national team's games in the previous two years.

From England, Wolff traveled to Germany for a try out with 2. Bundesliga club 1860 Munich. On December 6, 2006, 1860 Munich signed Wolff to a contract through the 2007–2008 season. Munich paid MLS a $191,000 transfer fee. Wolff joined the team during its January 2007 mid-winter training camp but was waived at the end of the 2008 season.

Wolff signed with the Kansas City Wizards on June 30, 2008. At the end of the 2010 MLS season, after two and a half seasons back in Kansas City, Wolff's contract option was declined by the club.

On December 15, 2010, Wolff was selected by D.C. United in Stage 2 of the 2010 MLS Re-Entry Draft and immediately signed a one-year contract with a club option for 2012.

Wolff announced his retirement on November 28, 2012, and became a full-time assistant coach with D.C. United.

International

Wolff has scored nine goals in fifty-two caps since his debut against Jamaica on September 8, 1999. He also starred for the US in the 2000 Summer Olympics, scoring two goals and helping the team to a fourth-place finish. As with his club teams, however, Wolff has had trouble securing a definite spot because of continual injury problems. He did play for the United States in the 2002 World Cup, assisting on the opening goal in the second-round win against Mexico. On May 2, 2006, Wolff was named to the US roster for the FIFA World Cup in Germany. Wolff played his last national team match versus Spain at Estadio El Sardinero on June 4, 2008.

International goals

Coaching career
After a season on the coaching staff at D.C. United, Wolff joined the Columbus Crew in November 2013, and remained an assistant coach until 2018. In 2018, Wolff joined the staff of the United States Men's National Team under Gregg Berhalter.

On July 23, 2019, Wolff was announced to be the first head coach of MLS expansion team Austin FC, who began playing with the 2021 season.

Austin FC had 9 wins, 21 defeats, and 4 draws in their expansion season under Wolff, finishing in 12th in the Western Conference, one point above Houston in last. Austin was eliminated from playoff contention on October 16 after a home defeat to Minnesota, with five matches to spare. Wolff played with a 4-3-3 or a 4-2-3-1 formation in his first season, and his team was characterized as having high possession numbers, and for building out from the back. Despite having the fourth-highest average percent possession per game at 53.9%, Austin scored the fewest goals in the league at 35. The team went into their match on October 30 against Dallas with a chance to win the first MLS Copa Tejas, but a 2–1 defeat meant that they finished in third. In his first season as a head coach, Wolff was questioned by the fans about his tactics and substitutions.

Personal life
Wolff's eldest son Tyler plays for Atlanta United, and his younger son Owen plays for him at Austin FC.

Coaching statistics

Honors

Chicago Fire
Lamar Hunt U.S. Open Cup: 1998, 2000
Major League Soccer MLS Cup: 1998
Major League Soccer Western Conference Championship: 1998

Kansas City Wizards
Lamar Hunt U.S. Open Cup: 2004
Major League Soccer Western Conference Championship: 2004

United States
CONCACAF Gold Cup: 2002, 2005

References

External links

1977 births
Living people
American soccer players
American expatriate soccer players
American expatriate soccer players in Germany
Chicago Fire FC players
MLS Pro-40 players
Sporting Kansas City players
TSV 1860 Munich players
D.C. United players
Olympic soccer players of the United States
CONCACAF Gold Cup-winning players
Footballers at the 2000 Summer Olympics
2002 CONCACAF Gold Cup players
2002 FIFA World Cup players
2005 CONCACAF Gold Cup players
2006 FIFA World Cup players
United States men's international soccer players
South Carolina Gamecocks men's soccer players
Expatriate footballers in Germany
Soccer players from Georgia (U.S. state)
Sportspeople from DeKalb County, Georgia
People from Stone Mountain, Georgia
Major League Soccer players
A-League (1995–2004) players
Major League Soccer All-Stars
2. Bundesliga players
United States men's under-20 international soccer players
United States men's under-23 international soccer players
D.C. United non-playing staff
Columbus Crew non-playing staff
Association football forwards
Austin FC coaches